Chaetostoma yurubiense is a species of catfish in the family Loricariidae. It is native to South America, where it occurs in the basins of the Aroa River, the Yaracuy River, and the Urama River in Venezuela. The species is found in rocky riffles in clear upland headwaters and small creeks, and it reaches  SL.

References

yurubiense
Fish described in 1996
Catfish of South America
Fish of Venezuela